The Mid-Del School District is a school district based in the Oklahoma City metropolitan area. It serves all of Midwest City and Del City, as well as a portion of Oklahoma City. As of 2007, the school district served more than 14,500 K-12 students.

The school district has grown from four original schools to include 21 middle and elementary schools and three high schools at present. It also includes the Mid-Del Technology Center, the only designated technology center in the state that shares a school board with a public school district.

History
The school district originated as a set of schools based solely in Midwest City, which consisted of prefabricated hutments with five teachers and 125 students. It originally included four schools, two of which were precursors to Sooner Elementary School and Soldier Creek Elementary School. A total of 1,250 students were enrolled in the second year of the school system.

The first permanent school building was dedicated in 1944, after two years of using temporary buildings. It cost $314,000 and was funded through the Lanham Act and Federal Works Agency. The building today houses Midwest City Middle School.

Oscar Rose was an early superintendent of the school district and the namesake for Midwest City's community college, Rose State.

Schools
The Mid-Del School District has a total of 21 public schools and a career technology school.

High schools
Carl Albert High School, Midwest City, Oklahoma
Del City High School, Del City, Oklahoma
Midwest City High School, Midwest City, Oklahoma

Middle schools
Carl Albert Middle School, Midwest City, Oklahoma
Midwest City Middle School, Midwest City, Oklahoma
Del City Middle School, Del City, Oklahoma

Elementary schools
Barnes Elementary School, Oklahoma City, Oklahoma
Cleveland Bailey Elementary School, Midwest City, Oklahoma
Country Estates Elementary School, Midwest City, Oklahoma
Del City Elementary School, Del City, Oklahoma
Epperly Heights Elementary School, Del City, Oklahoma
Highland Park Elementary School, Oklahoma City, Oklahoma
Midwest City Elementary School, Midwest City, Oklahoma 
Parkview Elementary School, Oklahoma City, Oklahoma
Pleasant Hill Early Childhood Center, Oklahoma City, Oklahoma
Ridgecrest Elementary School, Midwest City, Oklahoma
Schwartz Elementary School, Oklahoma City, Oklahoma
Soldier Creek Elementary School, Midwest City, Oklahoma
Steed Elementary School, Midwest City, Oklahoma
Tinker Elementary School, Oklahoma City, Oklahoma
Townsend Elementary School, Del City, Oklahoma

Technology Centers
Mid-Del Technology Center, Midwest City, Oklahoma

Notable alumni
J. T. Realmuto (born 1991), a Major League Baseball player for the Philadelphia Phillies

See also
List of school districts in Oklahoma

References

External links
Mid-Del Schools
Mid-Del Schools Foundation

Education in Oklahoma County, Oklahoma
School districts in Oklahoma
Midwest City, Oklahoma
Del City, Oklahoma